Moshe Ben-Ami (1898 – 18 February 1960) was an Israeli politician and lawyer.

Biography
Born in Tiberias at a time when it was part of the Ottoman Empire, Ben-Ami studied at a local yeshiva and at the Lipshitz Teachers' Seminary in Jerusalem. He also studied law at the Jerusalem School of Jurisprudence and was certified as a lawyer.

He became chairman of the Jewish neighbourhoods of Jaffa in 1943, serving for three years. He also chaired the Social Services Department of Tel Aviv city council, and was deputy chairman of the Sephardi Committee in the city.

In the first Knesset elections in 1949, he won a seat on the Sephardim and Oriental Communities list and served as a member of the Constitution, Law and Justice Committee, the House Committee and the Finance Committee. He lost his seat in the 1951 elections.

References

External links

1898 births
1960 deaths
People from Tiberias
20th-century Israeli lawyers
Sephardim and Oriental Communities politicians
Sephardi Jews in Ottoman Palestine
Sephardi Jews in Mandatory Palestine
Members of the 1st Knesset (1949–1951)